The Kongin Range ( or Конгинские Горы) is a mountain range in Magadan Oblast, Far Eastern Federal District, Russia.

The area of the range is uninhabited. Geologically the range is composed of limestone, dolerite and andesite of the Devonian period, as well as Devonian, Jurassic and Cretaceous rhyolite, with some granite and granodiorite intrusions.

Geography
The Kongin Range rises in the central sector of the Kolyma Highlands system.

The range is located in the interfluve of the Omolon, Kedon and Korkodon rivers. The Namyndykan (Намындыкан), a left tributary of the Omolon marks its northern limit, while the lower course of the Kedon and its left tributary Levaya Kedon limit the range to the east. To the west the range is limited by the Bulun and the Korkodon, while to the south it merges with the northern slopes of the Molkaty Range.

Hydrography

Flora
At higher elevations the only vegetation is mountain tundra. The barren high altitude zone is separated from the forest area by a belt of Siberian pine dwarf forest.

See also
List of mountains and hills of Russia

References

External links
SE - Kolyma - Колымское нагорье
С Чукотки на Колыму. Несуществующая дорога жизни
Mountain ranges of Magadan Oblast
Kolyma Mountains